Frizzleburg is an unincorporated community and census-designated place (CDP) in Lawrence County, Pennsylvania, United States. The population was 602 at the 2010 census.

Geography
Frizzleburg is located in northwestern Lawrence County at  (41.0778, -80.4547), in the south-central part of Pulaski Township. It is bordered on the south by Mahoning Township.

U.S. Route 422 (Ben Franklin Parkway) forms the southwestern side of the CDP; it leads southeastward  to New Castle, the Lawrence county seat, and west-northwest  to the center of Youngstown, Ohio. Pennsylvania Route 551 forms the eastern edge of the CDP, leading north  to the village of Pulaski and Interstate 376, and south  to Edinburg and U.S. Route 224.

Most of the community drains north, east, or southeast to the Shenango River, while a small portion on the southwestern side drains to Coffee Run and Marshall Run, tributaries of the Mahoning River. The Shenango and Mahoning rivers join south of New Castle to form the Beaver River, a southward-flowing tributary of the Ohio River.

Demographics

References

Census-designated places in Lawrence County, Pennsylvania
Census-designated places in Pennsylvania